Lewis Beach (March 30, 1835 – August 10, 1886) was an American politician and a U.S. Representative from New York representing two different congressional districts, the fourteenth and the fifteenth. In all, he served three terms in office before his death in 1886.

Biography
Born in New York City, Beach graduated from Yale Law School in 1856.

Career
Beach was admitted to the bar in 1856 and commenced practice in New York. He moved to Orange County, New York, in 1861, and served as member and treasurer of the Democratic State central committee from 1877 to 1879.

Elected as a Democrat to the Forty-seventh and Forty-eighth Congresses, Beach was a U. S. Representative for the fourteenth district of New York from March 4, 1881 to March 3, 1885. He was elected to the Forty-ninth Congress for the fifteenth district and served from March 4, 1885, until his death on August 10, 1886. He served as chairman of the Committee on Expenditures on Public Buildings during the Forty-ninth Congress.

He published a history of Cornwall, New York in 1873.

Death
Beach died, from typhoid fever and Bright's disease, at his home, "Knoll View" in Cornwall, Orange County, New York, on August 10, 1886 (age 51 years, 133 days). He is interred at Green-Wood Cemetery, Brooklyn, New York.

See also
List of United States Congress members who died in office (1790–1899)

References

External links

 

1835 births
1886 deaths
Burials at Green-Wood Cemetery
Yale Law School alumni
Democratic Party members of the United States House of Representatives from New York (state)
People from Cornwall, New York
19th-century American politicians
Politicians from New York City
Members of the United States House of Representatives from New York (state)